The 2012–13 Országos Bajnokság I is the 107th season of the Országos Bajnokság I, Hungary's premier Water polo league.

Team information

Regular season

Standings

Pld - Played; W - Won; L - Lost; PF - Points for; PA - Points against; Diff - Difference; Pts - Points.

Results
In the table below the home teams are listed on the left and the away teams along the top.

*match awarded

1 to 8 Playoff

Quarter-finals

1st leg

2nd leg

A-HÍD Szeged won series 2–0 and advanced to Semifinals.

ZF-Eger won series 2–0 and advanced to Semifinals.

TEVA-Vasas won series 2–0 and advanced to Semifinals.

Szolnoki Dózsa-Közgép won series 2–0 and advanced to Semifinals.

Semifinals

1st leg

2nd leg

Szolnoki Dózsa-Közgép won series 2–0 and advanced to Final.

ZF-Eger won series 2–0 and advanced to Final.

Final

1st leg

2nd leg

3rd leg

ZF-Eger won Championship final series 3–0.

Final standing

References

External links

Seasons in Hungarian water polo competitions
Hungary
Orszagos Bajnoksag
Orszagos Bajnoksag
2012 in water polo
2013 in water polo